Mary Jane Bunnett,  (born October 22, 1956) is a Canadian musician and educator. A soprano saxophonist, flautist and bandleader, she is especially known for performing Afro-Cuban jazz. She travels regularly to Cuba to perform with Cuban musicians.

Early life and education
She changed her instruments, from pursuing her career "as a classical pianist...at age 20 to jazz and to flute and soprano saxophone."

Career
Bunnett founded and leads an all-female Afro-Cuban/jazz group, Maqueque. Its other members are: Dánae Olano (vocals, piano), Yissy Garcia (drums), Magdelys Savigne (vocals, batá drums, congas); Elizabeth Rodriguez (vocals, violin), and Celia Jiménez (vocals, bass). The group has won one Juno Award (Best Group Jazz Album of the Year in 2014 for its debut CD) and garnered two Grammy nominations, while Bunnett herself has won four additional Juno Awards.

Honors and awards
In 2004, Bunnett was appointed an Officer of the Order of Canada, the highest civilian honour given in this country, granted to Canadian citizens 'for outstanding achievement and service to the country or to humanity at large.'

Personal life
Bunnett is married to another musician, trumpeter Larry Cramer. They reside in Toronto but have traveled to Cuba for musical collaborations for more than 30 years.

Bunnett is also a social activist.

Discography

List of awards and nominations

References

External links
 Official site
 Jane Bunnett at The Canadian Encyclopedia

1956 births
Living people
Afro-Cuban jazz saxophonists
Canadian jazz saxophonists
Canadian jazz composers
Canadian jazz flautists
Officers of the Order of Canada
Jazz soprano saxophonists
Women jazz saxophonists
Musicians from Toronto
Afro-Cuban jazz composers
Women flautists
Canadian world music musicians
Juno Award for Global Music Album of the Year winners
20th-century Canadian women musicians
Juno Award for Contemporary Jazz Album of the Year winners
21st-century saxophonists
21st-century Canadian women musicians
Sunnyside Records artists
Canadian women composers
20th-century flautists
21st-century flautists